The province of the South Sumatra in Indonesia is divided into regencies which are divided administratively into districts or kecamatan.

The districts of South Sumatra, with the regency each falls into, are as follows:

Abab (Penukal Abab), Muara Enim
Air Sugihan, Ogan Komering Ilir
Alang-Alang Lebar, Palembang
BKL Ulu Terawas, Musi Rawas
BTS Ulu, Musi Rawas
Babat Toman, Musi Banyuasin
Banding Agung, Ogan Komering Ulu Selatan
Banyuasin I, Banyuasin
Banyuasin II, Banyuasin
Banyuasin III, Banyuasin
Batang Harileko, Musi Banyuasin
Baturaja Barat, Ogan Komering Ulu
Baturaja Timur, Ogan Komering Ulu
Bayung Lencir, Musi Banyuasin
Belitang II, Ogan Komering Ulu Timur
Belitang III, Ogan Komering Ulu Timur
Belitang, Ogan Komering Ulu Timur
Benakat, Muara Enim
Betung, Banyuasin
Buay Madang, Ogan Komering Ulu Timur
Buay Pemaca, Ogan Komering Ulu Selatan
Buay Pemuka Peliung, Ogan Komering Ulu Timur
Buay Runjung, Ogan Komering Ulu Selatan
Buay Sandang Aji, Ogan Komering Ulu Selatan
Bukit Kecil, Palembang
Cambai, Prabumulih
Cempaka, Ogan Komering Ulu Timur
Cengal, Ogan Komering Ilir
Dempo Selatan, Pagar Alam
Dempo Tengah, Pagar Alam
Dempo Utara, Pagar Alam
Gandus, Palembang
Gelumbang, Muara Enim
Gunung Megang, Muara Enim
Ilir Barat I, Palembang
Ilir Barat II, Palembang
Ilir Timur I, Palembang
Ilir Timur II, Palembang
Indralaya, Ogan Ilir
Jarai, Lahat
Jayaloka, Musi Rawas
Jejawi, Ogan Komering Ilir
Kalidoni, Palembang
Karang Dapo, Musi Rawas
Karang Jaya, Musi Rawas
Kelekar, Muara Enim
Keluang, Musi Banyuasin
Kemuning, Palembang
Kertapati, Palembang
Kikim Barat, Lahat
Kikim Selatan, Lahat
Kikim Tengah, Lahat
Kikim Timur, Lahat
Kisam Tinggi, Ogan Komering Ulu Selatan
Kota Agung, Lahat
Kota Kayu Agung, Ogan Komering Ilir
Lahat, Lahat
Lais, Musi Banyuasin
Lalan, Musi Banyuasin
Lawang Kidul, Muara Enim
Lembak, Muara Enim
Lempuing Jaya, Ogan Komering Ilir
Lengkiti, Ogan Komering Ulu
Lintang Kanan, Lahat
Lubai, Muara Enim
Lubuk Batang, Ogan Komering Ulu
Lubuklinggau Barat I, Lubuklinggau
Lubuklinggau Barat II, Lubuklinggau
Lubuklinggau Selatan I, Lubuklinggau
Lubuklinggau Selatan II, Lubuklinggau
Lubuklinggau Timur I, Lubuklinggau
Lubuklinggau Timur II, Lubuklinggau
Lubuklinggau Utara I, Lubuklinggau
Lubuklinggau Utara II, Lubuklinggau
Madang Suku I, Ogan Komering Ulu Timur
Madang Suku II, Ogan Komering Ulu Timur
Makarti Jaya, Banyuasin
Mandi Aur, Muara Kelingi, Musi Rawas
Martapura, Ogan Komering Ulu Timur
Megang Sakti, Musi Rawas
Mekakau Ilir, Ogan Komering Ulu Selatan
Merapi, Lahat
Mesuji, Ogan Komering Ilir
Muara Belida, Muara Enim
Muara Beliti, Musi Rawas
Muara Enim, Muara Enim
Muara Kelingi, Musi Rawas
Muara Kuang, Ogan Ilir
Muara Lakitan, Musi Rawas
Muara Padang, Banyuasin
Muara Pinang, Lahat
Muara Rupit, Musi Rawas
Muara Telang, Banyuasin
Muaradua Kisam, Ogan Komering Ulu Selatan
Muaradua, Ogan Komering Ulu Selatan
Mulak Ulu, Lahat
Nibung, Musi Rawas
Pagar Alam Selatan, Pagar Alam
Pagar Alam Utara, Pagar Alam
Pajar Bulan, Lahat
Pampangan, Ogan Komering Ilir
Pasemah Air Keruh, Lahat
Pedamaran, Ogan Komering Ilir
Pematang Panggang, Ogan Komering Ilir
Pemulutan, Ogan Ilir
Pendopo Lintang, Empat Lawang
Pendopo, Lahat
Pengandonan, Ogan Komering Ulu
Peninjauan, Ogan Komering Ulu
Penukal Abab, Muara Enim
Penukal Utara, Muara Enim
Penukal, Muara Enim
Plaju, Palembang
Plakat Tinggi, Musi Banyuasin
Prabumulih Barat, Prabumulih
Prabumulih Timur, Prabumulih
Pulau Beringin, Ogan Komering Ulu Selatan
Pulau Pinang, Lahat
Pulau Rimau, Banyuasin
Purwodadi, Musi Rawas
Rambang Dangku, Muara Enim
Rambang Kapak Tengah, Prabumulih
Rambang, Muara Enim
Rambutan, Banyuasin
Rantau Alai, Ogan Ilir
Rantau Bayur, Banyuasin
Rawas Ilir, Musi Rawas
Rawas Ulu, Musi Rawas
Sako, Palembang
Sanga Desa, Musi Banyuasin
Seberang Ulu I, Palembang
Seberang Ulu II, Palembang
Sekayu, Musi Banyuasin
Selangit, Musi Rawas
Sematang Borang, Palembang
Semendawai Suku III, Ogan Komering Ulu Timur
Semende Darat Laut, Muara Enim
Semende Darat Tengah, Muara Enim
Semende Darat Ulu, Muara Enim
Semidang Aji, Ogan Komering Ulu
Simpang, Ogan Komering Ulu Selatan
Sirah Pulau Padang, Ogan Komering Ilir
Sosoh Buay Rayap, Ogan Komering Ulu
Sukarame, Palembang
Sungai Keruh, Musi Banyuasin
Sungai Lilin, Musi Banyuasin
Sungai Rotan, Muara Enim
Talang Kelapa, Banyuasin
Talang Padang, Lahat
Talang Ubi, Muara Enim
Tanah Abang, Muara Enim
Tanjung Agung, Muara Enim
Tanjung Batu, Ogan Ilir
Tanjung Lubuk, Ogan Komering Ilir
Tanjung Raja, Ogan Ilir
Tanjung Sakti, Lahat
Tebing Tinggi, Lahat
Tugumulyo, Musi Rawas
Tulung Selapan, Ogan Komering Ilir
Ujan Mas, Muara Enim
Ulu Musi, Lahat
Ulu Ogan, Ogan Komering Ulu
Ulu Rawas, Musi Rawas

 
South Sumatra